Swartswood is an unincorporated community located on the border of Hampton and Stillwater townships in Sussex County, New Jersey, United States. Swartswood has a post office with ZIP code 07877.

References

Hampton Township, New Jersey
Stillwater Township, New Jersey
Unincorporated communities in Sussex County, New Jersey
Unincorporated communities in New Jersey